This is a list of mosques in Australia.

A listing of mosques and musallahs in Australia was maintained by Islamiaonline until around 2016.

Australian Capital Territory 
The following is a list of mosques in the Australian Capital Territory.

New South Wales 
The following is a list of mosques in New South Wales.

Queensland 
The following is a list of mosques in Queensland.

South Australia 
The following is a list of mosques in South Australia.

Tasmania 
The following is the only mosque in Tasmania.

Victoria 
The following is a list of mosques in Victoria.

Western Australia 
The following is a list of mosques in Western Australia.

Australian external territories

Christmas Island 

There is one mosque on Christmas Island, which is located in Flying Fish Cove, the main town on the island.

Cocos (Keeling) Islands 

The territory of Cocos (Keeling) Islands is an external territory of Australia. There are only two permanently inhabited islands:
 The West Island Mosque is a heritage-listed mosque at Alexander Street,  on West Island. 

 The Home Island Mosque is on Home Island.

See also
 List of mosques in Oceania

References

Australia
List
Mosques